The 2003 Tour de Pologne was the 60th edition of the Tour de Pologne cycle race and was held from 8 September to 14 September 2003. The race started in Gdańsk and finished in Karpacz. The race was won by Cezary Zamana.

General classification

References

2003
Tour de Pologne
September 2003 sports events in Europe